Ali Dilem  (born 1967 in El Harrach, Alger Province) is an Algerian cartoonist. On 11 February 2006, he was sentenced to one year in jail and a 50,000 dinar fine by an Algerian court for a dozen cartoons printed in the newspaper Liberté in 2003 depicting President Abdelaziz Bouteflika.

See also 
Imprisonment of Mohamed Benchicou, director of Le Matin

External links
"Cartoonist Ali Dilem given one-year jail sentence", Reporters Without Borders, 2006-02-17

1967 births
Algerian cartoonists
Living people
People from El Harrach
Kabyle people
Fatwas
21st-century Algerian people